The Barrymore family, and the related Drew family, form a British-American acting dynasty which traces its acting roots to the mid-19th century London stage. After migrating to the US family members were active in motion pictures.

The surname Barrymore originated from an actor named William Barrymore. The Drew family traces to the Irish actor John Drew Sr.

List of members

 William Edward Blythe (1818–1873), married Matilda Chamberlayne (1822–1849); they had seven children
 Herbert Arthur Chamberlayne Blythe (aka Maurice Barrymore (1849–1905)) married Georgiana Emma Drew, and had three children: Lionel, Ethel, and John.
 Lionel Barrymore (1878–1954)
∞ Married Doris Rankin (first wife), and had two daughters. Marriage ended in divorce.
 Mary Barrymore (died in infancy, 2 years old)
  Ethel Barrymore II (died in infancy).
∞ Married to Irene Fenwick (second wife, until her death)
 Ethel Barrymore (1879–1959)
∞ Married Russell Griswold Colt, and had three children. Ethel's children also acted, primarily on the stage.
 Samuel Peabody Colt
 John Drew Colt
 Ethel Barrymore Colt.
∞ Married John Romeo Miglietta, and had John Drew Miglietta (born 1946)
 John Barrymore (1882–1942)
 ∞ Married to Katherine Corri Harris (first wife, divorced)
 ∞ Married Blanche Oelrichs (second wife, divorced), and had:
 Diana Blanche Barrymore
 ∞ Married Bramwell Fletcher
 ∞ Married John R. Howard
 ∞ Married Robert Wilcox
 ∞ Married Dolores Costello (third wife, divorced), and had:
 Dolores Ethel Mae Barrymore (living).
 ∞ Married Thomas Fairbanks (first husband, divorced), and had:
 Hillary Klaradru Fairbanks (living),
 ∞ married Thomas Randolph and had:
 Isabelle Harrison Barrymore Randolph
 Anthony John Barrymore Fairbanks
∞ married Dianne Zaninovich and had:
 Samantha Mae Barrymore Fairbanks.
 ∞ Married Lew Bedell (second husband) and had:
 Dore Lewis Bedell
 Stephanie Mae Bedell
 John Drew Barrymore (Jr.) (1932–2004)
 ∞ Married Cara Williams (first wife, divorced)
  John Blyth Barrymore
 ∞ Married Rebecca Pogrow
 Blyth Lane Barrymore
 Sabrina Brooke Barrymore
 ∞ Married Jacqueline Manes
 John Blyth Barrymore IV
 ∞ Married Gabriella Palazzoli (second wife, divorced)
 Blyth Dolores Barrymore. ∞ Married Antonio Gioffredi
 Gabriella Gioffredi
 Nicole Gioffredi
 ∞ Married Nina Wayne (third wife, divorced)
 Jessica Barrymore (died 2014, accidental overdose)
 ∞ Married Ildiko Jaid (fourth wife, divorced)
 Drew Barrymore (born 1975)
 ∞ Married Jeremy Thomas (first husband, divorced)
 ∞ Married Tom Green (second husband, divorced)
 ∞ Married Will Kopelman (third husband, divorced)
 Olive Barrymore Kopelman
 Frankie Barrymore Kopelman
 ∞ Married to Elaine Barrie née Jacobs. (fourth wife of John Barrymore Sr., divorced)

Except for John Drew Barrymore, Diana, Drew, and John Blyth, none of the other members of John Barrymore's family have yet entered the entertainment industry. Most of the spouses, however, were related to the artistic world, mainly actresses and actors.

Drew family
The family of Georgiana Emma Drew, mother of Lionel, Ethel, and John, also includes a large number of actors.

 John Drew, actor
 ∞ Louisa Lane Drew, actress
 Georgiana Emma Drew, ∞ wife of Maurice Barrymore and mother of Lionel, Ethel, and John.
 John Drew Jr., 'Uncle Jack' by the Barrymore siblings, married actress Josephine Baker 'Aunt Dodo', daughter of his mother's best friend.
 Louise Drew, 'Cousin Bee', ∞ married performer Jack Devereaux; their son John Drew Devereaux (1918–1995) was a Broadway stage manager
 Sidney Drew (paternity debatable), known for the Mr. & Mrs. Sidney Drew comedy act.  Married to first wife Gladys Rankin 1890–1914 her death. Wife two was Lucille McVey 1914 to his death in 1919.
 Sidney Rankin Drew, son of Sidney Drew and Gladys Rankin, left his acting career to join the Lafayette Escadrille, and was killed in action
 Louisa Drew (1851–1889), eldest child of Louisa Lane Drew and John Drew Sr., called 'Aunt Wisa' by the Barrymores, moved to Boston, married manager Charles Mendum (1849–1917), had two or ?three children, one of which was Georgie Mendum
 Georgie Drew Mendum (1875–1957), actress, named after her aunt Georgie Drew Barrymore, married and divorced from a comedian named George Parsons, (married 1903, divorced 1912). Sometimes stayed at the Mamaroneck home of her cousin Ethel Barrymore.
 Frank Drew (1831–1903), actor, brother of John Drew Sr.

Family tree

References

External links

Barrymore schematic (Etsy Magazine October 1937)

 
American families of English ancestry